Crooked Corner is a locality on the road from Bigga, New South Wales to Binda, New South Wales, which was once a town.

Alluvial gold was found there, in 1861, and reef gold, in 1871. In the late 1880s another reef was found to the east of the old alluvial workings, and the Palmer Gold and Silver Mining Company set up a battery there in 1888.

The Five Mile Tree public school operated there from 1892 to 2009.

References

Upper Lachlan Shire
Localities in New South Wales
Southern Tablelands